Glyphipterix scintilla is a species of sedge moth in the genus Glyphipterix. It was described by Clarke in 1926. It can be found in New Zealand.

References

Moths described in 1926
Glyphipterigidae
Moths of New Zealand
Endemic fauna of New Zealand
Endemic moths of New Zealand